Oliver Eyro Thychosen (born 17 January 1993) is a retired Danish professional footballer.

Club career

Vejle BK & Vejle-Kolding
Thychosen got his debut for the first team at the age of 18 on 14 May 2011, where he came on the pitch and replaced Kim Olsen in the 87th minute. He scored his first goal for the first team in the same match, in the 89th minut.

FC Nordsjælland
On 3 July 2013, FC Nordsjælland confirmed that they had purchased Thychosen.

His injuries continued at his new club, and for this reason, he only played 13 matches in the league, in his first season.

Loan to Vejle BK
On 1 February 2016, Vejle confirmed that they had signed their former player, Thychosen, on a loan deal for the rest of the season.

Hobro IK
After joining Viborg FF in the summer 2016, Tychosen left the club after three years to join Hobro IK. The deal was announced on 20 June 2019.

On 21 May 2022 it was confirmed, that 29-year old Thychosen would retire at the end of the season. Thychosen subsequently revealed in an interview that since his cruciate ligament injury in 2016, he had been having problems with his knee, which was the reason he had to retire.

References

External links
 
  Oliver Thychosen on DBU

1993 births
Living people
People from Vejle Municipality
Association football midfielders
Danish men's footballers
Danish Superliga players
Danish 1st Division players
Vejle Boldklub players
Vejle Boldklub Kolding players
FC Nordsjælland players
Viborg FF players
Hobro IK players
Denmark youth international footballers
Sportspeople from the Region of Southern Denmark